Thomas Johnston Buchan (27 October 1874 – 29 May 1962) was an Australian rules footballer who played with Geelong in the Victorian Football League (VFL).

Notes

External links 

1874 births
1962 deaths
Australian rules footballers from Melbourne
Geelong Football Club players
People from Prahran, Victoria